Nabiollah "Nabi" Sorouri (1933–2002) was an Iranian welterweight freestyle wrestler. He was a member of the national team between 1953 and 1960. He won gold medal at the world championships in 1957 and placed fourth at the 1956 Summer Olympics. At the 1965 FILA Wrestling World Championships Sorouri was the head coach of Iran national wrestling team.

References

1933 births
2002 deaths
Olympic wrestlers of Iran
Wrestlers at the 1956 Summer Olympics
Iranian male sport wrestlers
Asian Games silver medalists for Iran
Asian Games medalists in wrestling
Wrestlers at the 1958 Asian Games
Azerbaijani emigrants to Iran
Soviet emigrants to Iran
Sportspeople from Baku
World Wrestling Champions
Medalists at the 1958 Asian Games